Juan Alonso de Solis y Mendoza (June 13, 1574 – April 19, 1641) was a Roman Catholic prelate who served as Bishop of Puerto Rico (1635–1641).

Biography
Juan Alonso de Solis y Mendoza was born in Salamanca, Spain on June 13, 1574 and ordained a priest in the Order of Carmelites. On January 11, 1635, he was appointed by the King of Spain and confirmed on September 1, 1636 by Pope Urban VIII as Bishop of Puerto Rico. In August 1637, he was consecrated bishop by Facundo de la Torre, Archbishop of Santo Domingo. He served as Bishop of Puerto Rico until his death on April 19, 1641.

References

External links and additional sources
 (for Chronology of Bishops) 
 (for Chronology of Bishops) 

1574 births
1640 deaths
People from Salamanca
Bishops appointed by Pope Urban VIII
Carmelite bishops
17th-century Roman Catholic bishops in Puerto Rico
Roman Catholic bishops of Puerto Rico